Ensemble for Somnambulists is a 1951 American unfinished experimental silent short. It was written, produced, and directed by Maya Deren. The film was made while Deren was teaching a workshop at the Toronto Film Society. Along with Deren the film was produced by M. Armour and D. Burritt and had cinematography by Graeme Ferguson and Bruce Parsons. The film stars Frank Ionson, Brian Macdonald, Hannah Winner, Cynthia Barrett and Terry Chapman.

The film was never completed and is officially unpublished, but it has been restored and occasionally screens along with Deren's other films. It is sort of a preliminary sketch for her next film The Very Eye of Night.

Cast
 Cynthia Barrett as Female Dancer 
 Terry Chapman as Ensemble Dancer 1
 Frank Ionson as Ensemble Dancer 2 
 Brian Macdonald as Male Dancer
 Hannah Winner as Ensemble Dancer 3

References

External links

1951 films
1951 short films
1950s unfinished films
1950s avant-garde and experimental films
American avant-garde and experimental films
American silent short films
American black-and-white films
Films directed by Maya Deren
1950s American films